Chevé is a surname. Notable people with the surname include:

 Émile-Joseph-Maurice Chevé (1804–1864), French music theorist and educator
 Jacqueline Chevé (1961–2010), French politician

See also
 Chevé Cave, one of the deepest caves on Earth
 Cheves